Roque de la Cruz may refer to:

 Roche MacGeoghegan (1580–1644), also known as Roque de la Cruz, Irish Dominican prelate and Tridentine reformist
 Roque de la Cruz (cyclist) (born 1964), Spanish racing cyclist